Thomas Clarkson, ( January 26, 1802 – May 4, 1874), was an English Canadian merchant, banker, businessman, receiver, director, and associated with the Family Compact, although was noted for his desire to increase free trade relations with the United States whom he described as "Canada's most important traders and partners", even advocating for an ambassador be sent to D.C. to exert "some active, intelligent, and influential representation of the commercial interests of Canada near the controlling power of the United States" and reciprocity with the British West India Island. He established the trustee and receivership business which would eventually become Clarkson Gordon in 1864 and was a founder, incorporator and first president of the Toronto Board of Trade, president of the Commercial Building and Investment Society, director (alongside William Molson, John A. Macdonald, and James Morton) of the Beacon Fire and Life Insurance Co. of London, the Toronto for Unity Fire Association (of London) with Allan MacNab, Federick Jarvis, and Benjamin Cronyn, and the Bank of Toronto where he additionally served as Vice President in 1859.

Thomas was a highly prominent early Toronto financier, described in a local paper following a June 1858 presentation of Handel's oratorio of Judas Maccabaeus in St Lawrence Hall, "as one of the distinguished patrons, which included such notables as Sir John Beverley Robinson and John A. Macdonald"

Life and career
Thomas was born in Scotter, Lincolnshire in 1802 to Anglican parents, he emigrated to York, Upper Canada in 1832 aboard the packet ship the New York not long after the death of his first wife. He began specialising in goods on commission, specifically grain and financing and was in partnership with Thomas Brunskill of Thornhill in 1845. In 1842, the business purchased 2,082 gallons of whiskey from Gooderham and Worts. Gooderham's own son George Horace Gooderham was schoolboy friends with Thomas', Edward Roper Curzon Clarkson, and alongside Aemilius Jarvis were sailors and members of Royal Canadian Yacht Club on Toronto Island where the Clarkson family owned substantial land holdings. By the latter half of the 1840s, Clarkson participated in several financial ventures in Upper Canada; first serving as president of the Annexation Association, before becoming involved in the newly formed Stock Exchange. He was one of the original founders of the Toronto Board of Trade, serving as president from 1852 to 1859. On his retirement from this post, he expressed caution about the problems of trade in Canada under current policies.

Thomas supported reducing tariffs on trade and campaigned hard for reduced legislation on trade restriction laws, tariffs, and anti-immigration. Alongside other grain merchants, he established the Bank of Toronto and served as director from 1856 to 1858. The economic depression following 1857 saw some of his ventures fail, notably the Toronto and Georgian Bay Canal Company, a venture in which he appeared at the head of the list of incorporators of the company a year earlier and chaired investor meetings in 1854.

Work in Milwalkee 
Thomas then moved to Milwaukee, Wisconsin, where economic growth proved better prospects. Alongside his sons Benjamin Reid and Robert Guy, Thomas established T Clarkson and Sons, a grain and produce commission business which Robert Guy continued to operate upon Thomas' return to Canada in 1864.

Return to Canada 
In 1864, with economic prospects in Milwaukee worsening, Thomas became an assignee in bankruptcy for the province and contributed substantially toward early accounting practices in Canada. This company, Clarkson, Hunter and Company, became the foundation for the accounting firm Clarkson Gordon & Co. By 1872, Thomas had suffered a paralytic stroke and was unable to continue operating the grain storage elevator he had purchased in 1869, his work with the Produce Merchants Exchange, nor his assignee business.

Death and legacy

Clarkson died in Toronto in 1874 soon after suffering a stroke in 1872. His son, Edward Roper Curzon Clarkson, would grow Thomas’ trustee and receivership business into Clarkson Gordon to one of the largest accounting firms in Canada until its merger with Ernst & Young in the 1980s. ERC was a pioneer corporate rescues in Canada, eventually convincing the financial institutions who sought his counsel in winding-up to allow him to operate the business as a going concern. ERC was, by 1898, "Charged with the management of three-fourths of the large estates wound up in the Province of Ontario for many past years. [A] life member of Ionic Lodge A.F. & A.M, a member of the Board of Directors of the Credit Foncier Franco-Canadien Loan Co, a director of the Consolidated Land & Investment Co and of Might's Directory Company."

References

External links
Biography at the Dictionary of Canadian Biography Online

1802 births
1874 deaths
Canadian Anglicans
Pre-Confederation Canadian businesspeople
Members of the Legislative Council of Upper Canada
Scottish emigrants to pre-Confederation Ontario
Businesspeople from Milwaukee
People from York, Upper Canada
People from Lincolnshire
Toronto-Dominion Bank
18th-century Canadian businesspeople
19th-century American businesspeople